Intentional misspelling may refer to:
 Sensational spelling
 Satiric misspelling